Timothy Brandon Stephens (born December 29, 1997) is an American football cornerback for the Baltimore Ravens of the National Football League (NFL). He played college football at UCLA and SMU.

Early life and high school
Stephens grew up in Plano, Texas and attended Plano Senior High School. As a senior, he rushed for 1,389 yards and 15 touchdowns and was named All-State. Stephens initially committed to play college football at Stanford, but decommitted and ultimately chose to play at UCLA.

College career
Stephens began his collegiate career at UCLA, where he played running back. After playing in only two games as a junior and graduating in three years, Stephens announced that he would be leaving the program.

Stephens transferred to SMU and was eligible to play immediately as a graduate transfer. During the offseason, SMU's coaching staff moved him to the cornerback position after a conversation with head coach Sonny Dykes. Stephens became a starter going into his first season with the team and led SMU with 12 passes broken up. As a redshirt senior, he recorded 43 tackles with 10 passes broken up and one interception.

Professional career

Baltimore Ravens
Stephens was selected in the third round with the 104th overall pick of the 2021 NFL Draft by the Baltimore Ravens. On July 21, 2021, Stephens signs his four-year rookie contract with the Ravens.

References

External links
SMU Mustangs bio
UCLA Bruins bio

Living people
Players of American football from Texas
American football cornerbacks
SMU Mustangs football players
Sportspeople from Plano, Texas
1997 births
UCLA Bruins football players
Baltimore Ravens players
American football running backs